Nauman Aman (born 9 November 1983) is a Pakistani first-class cricketer who played for Rawalpindi cricket team.

References

External links
 

1983 births
Living people
Pakistani cricketers
Attock Group cricketers
Rawalpindi cricketers
Cricketers from Rawalpindi